The Otram River, formerly the Port Maria River or the Port Maria Western River, is a river in Saint Mary Parish, Jamaica. It reaches the sea in the parish capital of Port Maria and contributes to flooding in that town.

It is joined at Trinity by the Negro River, where an aqueduct, completed in 1797, of over a mile's length once drew water from the Otram to supply Trinity sugar plantation there.

See also
List of rivers of Jamaica
Paggee River

References

Rivers of Jamaica